Kløvsteinbakken is a ski jumping large hill in Meldal, Norway.

History
It was built in 1946-1947 and owned by Meldal IL, Orklahopp. First official competition was held on 7 February 1948. It hosted one FIS Ski jumping World Cup event in 1988. Jan Christian Bjørn holds the hill record.

World Cup

Men

Ski jumping venues in Norway
Sport in Norway
Sports venues completed in 1948